The 1939 FIBA European Championship, commonly called FIBA EuroBasket 1939, was the third FIBA EuroBasket regional basketball championship, held by FIBA. Eight national teams affiliated with the International Basketball Federation (FIBA) took part in the competition.  Defending champions Lithuania hosted the tournament, held in Kaunas Sports Hall.

Tickets
The prices for tickets were high at the time: The price for a seat was 2.5–5 LTL, and for a standing spot 1.5–2 LTL.

Venue

One of the toughest question was where the competition games of the Third European Basketball Championship should be played. First European Championship was held in a primitively adapted exhibitions hall, second – in adapted former factory premises. Firstly, there was a thought to organize it in an open-court with a hanging tarpaulin roof, protecting from the rain, in the that time State Court (currently Darius and Girėnas Stadium). Although, such building wasn't suitable nor for the Lithuania, nor for the FIBA. It was decided to build completely new sports hall for the basketball games. Anatolijus Rozenbliumas projected the new basketball hall with capacity of 11.000 people (3.500 seats). It cost around 400.000 LTL, however nobody complained about its necessarily and its building progress. Kaunas Sports Hall was built in time. Many helpers participated in construction. One of them, Donatas Banionis, remembers: "I remember 1939 European Championship in Kaunas. Then the Kaunas Sports Hall was built. On the eve of the tournament I learned from friends that helpers are required to number the benches. Free observation of the games was promised for that. This, for us – boys, was a staggering thing. The cheapest ticket to all the games cost 10 LTL. So I numbered the sports hall benches with dye honestly".

Opening and closing ceremonies
The opening ceremony of the EuroBasket 1939 took place on 21 May 1939. Independent Lithuania sport historian, Jonas Narbutas, wrote: "The interest in the competition, of course, was huge. But still it was hardly imaginable that even that big event may attract such wide masses. It seemed that the whole Kaunas swam into the National Stadium. Tides of people attended the Vytautas hill: by foot, by driving. Generations of times swam into the hall: near the gray-headed there was his aging son with his children, small and big swam, of all ages and castes. The hall possibly sheltered 10.000 of people. It is doubtful that more could fit there. It was possible to sell 20.000 tickets to the opening and the closing ceremonies". The opening ceremony was started by the Lithuanian president Antanas Smetona speech.

Teams and their compositions

At first, after sending the invitations, 17 countries wished to compete. Even the basketball newcomers Great Britain, Turkey, and Germany planned to participate in it. Because of this, one of the issued postage stamp had flags of 17 countries. Though, when Kaunas was waiting for the guests from all the European countries, World War II phantom was already wandering in Europe. That changed things, with some of the 17 planned countries no longer interested in participating in the tournament.

Eight teams arrived. Despite that, all the strongest teams of the EuroBasket 1937 participated (Lithuania, Italy, France). The championship prestige was also raised with the very capable Baltic teams participation (Latvia, Estonia). Most of the teams arrived at Kaunas firmly strengthened: Lithuania, Poland, Estonia, Latvia, Italy national teams had emigrants, who finished studies in the United States of America.

Everyone was thrilled with the question: will tall (unlimited) height players participation be allowed? At that time FIBA had a rule which distributed players into two groups: lower than 1.90 meter and taller than 1.90 meter. Though, this rule never was used practically. Two teams had players taller than 1.90 meter: Estonia (Ralf Viksten – 1.98 meter) and Lithuania (Pranas Lubinas – 2.00 or 2.01 meter). Just one day before the competition, FIBA Technical Committee reached a decision allowing players of all heights to compete.

Gallery

Results
The 1939 competition was in a very simple format.  Each team played each of the other teams once.  A win was worth 2 standings points, a loss worth 1.  The rankings were based on those standing points. Ties were broken by head-to-head results.
The winning team was Lithuania. In retrospect, the most important match was Lithuania vs Latvia in the first round. Lithuania won by 1 point, and this was the eventual winning margin of the championship. Relations between the two nations soured to such an extent that it led to the cancellation of the subsequent 1939 Baltic Cup football tournament.

Match results

Final standings

Source: fibaeurope.com

Team rosters
Lithuania's Lubinas previously played for the gold medal-winning United States national basketball team at the 1936 Summer Olympics.

1. Lithuania: Pranas Lubinas, Mykolas Ruzgys, Feliksas Kriaučiūnas, Leonas Baltrūnas, Zenonas Puzinauskas, Artūras Andrulis, Pranas Mažeika, Leonas Petrauskas, Eugenijus Nikolskis, Vytautas Norkus, Jurgis Jurgėla, Mindaugas Šliūpas, Vytautas Budriūnas, Vytautas Lesčinskas (Coach: Pranas Lubinas)

2. Latvia: Visvaldis Melderis, Kārlis Arents, Jānis Graudiņš, Teodors Grīnbergs, Maksis Kazāks, Alfrēds Krauklis, Voldemārs Šmits, Juris Solovjovs, Aleksandrs Vanags, Kārlis Satiņš (Coach: Valdemārs Baumanis)

3. Poland: Paweł Stok, Bogdan Bartosiewicz, Jerzy Gregołajtis, Florian Grzechowiak, Zdzisław Kasprzak, Ewaryst Łój, Stanisław Pawlowski, Zbigniew Resich, Jerzy Rossudowski, Jarosław Śmigielski (Coach: Walenty Kłyszejko)

4. France: Robert Busnel, Vladimir Fabrikant, Henri Lesmayoux, Fernand Prudhomme, Jean Jeammes, Etienne Roland, Emile Frezot, Robert Cohu, Maurice Mertz, Abel Gravier, Andre Ambroise, Gaston Falleur, Gabriel Gonnet, Alexandre Katlama (Coach: Paul Geist)

5. Estonia: Heino Veskila, Evald Mahl, Oskar Erikson, Ralf Viksten, Georg Vinogradov, Erich Altosaar, Artur Amon, Hans Juurup, Valdeko Valdmäe, Herbert Tillemann (Coach: Herbert Niiler)

References

External links
FIBA Europe EuroBasket 1939
Eurobasket.com 1939 EChampionship

1939
1939 in basketball
1939
Sports competitions in Kaunas
Basketball in Kaunas
1939 in Lithuanian sport
May 1939 sports events
20th century in Kaunas